Pristava is a settlement in the Municipality of Cirkulane in the Haloze area of eastern Slovenia. It lies in the valley of Belana Creek and its tributaries west and southwest of Cirkulane. The area traditionally belonged to the Styria region. It is now included in the Drava Statistical Region.

References

External links
Pristava on Geopedia

Populated places in the Municipality of Cirkulane